The battle of Enerhodar was a military engagement between the Russian Armed Forces and the Armed Forces of Ukraine during the southern Ukraine offensive of the 2022 Russian invasion of Ukraine over the city of Enerhodar in Zaporizhzhia Oblast, on March 4 2022. Enerhodar is the location of the Zaporizhzhia Nuclear Power Plant, which generates nearly half of the country's electricity derived from nuclear power and more than a fifth of total electricity generated in Ukraine, as well as the nearby thermal power station. 

After attacking protesting civilians on March 3, Russian forces engaged Ukrainian forces at the nuclear power plant and took control of it, seizing Enerhodar the same day. The area remains under Russian occupation.

Battle 
On 28 February, the Russian Ministry of Defense announced that they captured the city of Enerhodar and the Zaporizhzhia Nuclear Power Plant. However, the mayor of Enerhodar, Dmytro Orlov, denied that the city and the power plant had been captured. Local citizens later barricaded the road to the plant and the entrance to the city, forcing the Russian forces to turn back.

On 1 March, Ukrainian officials stated that Russian forces had surrounded the city, with a Russian convoy heading into Enerhodar around 2:00 pm. According to Orlov, the city had difficulties obtaining food. In the evening, a protest by local residents blocked Russian forces from entering the city.

In the morning of 2 March, Orlov stated that Russian troops were again approaching the city. Protestors again blocked the roads; protestors carried Ukrainian flags and used garbage trucks as part of the blockade. Orlov told Ukrinform that two people were wounded when Russian soldiers allegedly threw grenades at a crowd of civilians. By 6:00 pm, the protest included two hundred residents, as well as power plant workers. Rafael Grossi, the Director General of the International Atomic Energy Agency, stated that the IAEA had been informed by Russian authorities that Russian forces were in control of territory around the nuclear power plant.

At 11:28 pm local time on the 3 March 2022, a column of 10 Russian armored vehicles and two tanks cautiously approached the Zaporizhzhia Nuclear Power Plant. The action commenced at 12:48 am on the 4 March when Ukrainian forces fired anti tank missiles at the tanks leading the column, and Russian forces responded with a variety of weapons, including rocket-propelled grenades. Russian forces then entered the parking area near the front gate. Most of the Russian fire was directed towards the training center and main administrative building, but Russian forces also fired heavy weapons in the direction of the reactor buildings multiple times. During approximately two hours of heavy fighting a fire broke out in a training facility outside of the main complex, which was extinguished by 6:20 am, though other sections surrounding the plant sustained damage. Later that day, IAEA confirmed that the safety systems of the plant had not been affected and there was no release of radioactive material.

Russian forces also entered Enerhodar and took control of it. Orlov stated that the city lost its heating supply as a result of the battle.

Aftermath 

Oleksandr Starukh, the governor of Zaporizhzhia Oblast, stated on 5 March that Russian forces had left Enerhodar after looting it and the situation in the city was completely under control of local authorities. However, Orlov denied the report and stated that Russian forces still occupied the perimeter of the city and the power plant, with local authorities still managing the city. The Ukrainian military administration for the southeast confirmed on 7 March that Enerhodar was under control of Russian forces.

See also 
 Battle of Chernobyl

References 

Enerhodar
History of Zaporizhzhia Oblast
Military nuclear accidents and incidents
Southern Ukraine campaign
Battles involving Russia
Battles involving Ukraine
Battles post-1945